Maurizio Bedin (born 9 February 1979 in Camposampiero) is an Italian former professional footballer who played as a midfielder.

He played three seasons (14 games, no goals) in the Serie A for U.S. Lecce and Udinese Calcio.

Honours
Udinese
UEFA Intertoto Cup: 2000

References

External links
 
 

1979 births
Living people
Association football midfielders
Italian footballers
Serie A players
Serie B players
Calcio Padova players
Udinese Calcio players
A.C. Monza players
U.S. Lecce players
U.C. Sampdoria players
Cosenza Calcio 1914 players
S.S.D. Pro Sesto players
S.P.A.L. players
A.S.D. Martina Calcio 1947 players